Tongwon University (동원대학교) is a South Korean higher institution located in Gwangju, Gyeonggi. It has 17 departments and over 3600 students. It was founded in 1993 by Dr. Tong-Won Lee.

History 

Founder: Dr. Tong-Won Lee

 1993 - Tongwon College of Technology
 1998 - Tongwon College

Notable people 
Ju Ji-hoon, actor

Departments 

 Digital Information and Electronics
 Computer and Information Technology
 Information and Communication
 Architecture
 Fire Safety Management
 Interior Architecture
 e-Business
 Computer Animation
 Mobile Contents and Internet
 Publishing and Media
 Industrial Design
 Secretary and Administration
 Library and Education Service
 Tourism
 Accounting and Tax Information
 Hotel and Food Service
 Real Estate Consulting
 Management
 Child Welfare
 Hairdressing and Aesthetics
 Health and Medical Information
 Media and Creative Writing
 Leisure Sports

External links 

 Official homepage

Universities and colleges in Gyeonggi Province